is a district located in Yamanashi Prefecture, Japan.

As of February 1, 2006, the district has an estimated population of 17,878 and a density of 238 persons per km2. The total area is 75.07 km2.

As of March 1, 2006, the district has only one town left.
Ichikawamisato (founded on October 1, 2005 by the mergers of the towns of Ichikawadaimon, Mitama and Rokugō)

History
Before the Massive mergers of Showa, the east shore of Fujigawa belonged to Nishiyatsushiro District, and the west shore belonged to Minamikoma District.

On February 11, 1955 when the town of Okawauchi merged with the town of Minobu from Minamikoma District and 3 towns to form the new "town of Minobu in Minamikoma District," 
On April 1, 1955 the village of Sakae merged with the village of Akatsukisawa from Minamikoma District to form the town of Nambu in Minamikoma District.
On September 30, 1956, parts of the village of Daido went to the town of Ajisawa in Minamikoma District.
On January 1, 1958, parts of the town of Ichikawadaimon were merged into the town of Ajisawa.
On April 1, 1958, parts of the town of Shimobe merged into the town of Nakatomi in Minamikoma District; Nishiyatsushiro District started to eat more areas by Minamikoma District.
On September 13, 2004, the town of Shimobe merged with the towns of Minobu (former) and Nakatomi, both from Minamikoma District, to form the town of Minobu, in Minamikoma District.
On October 1, 2005, the towns of Ichikawadaimon, Mitama and Rokugō merged to form the new town of Ichikawamisato.
On March 1, 2006:
the northern part of Kamikuishiki (the localities of Furuseki, Kakehashi) merged into the city of Kōfu
the southern part of Kamikuishiki (the localities of Fujigane, Motosu, Shoji) merged into the town of Fujikawaguchiko, in Minamitsuru District.

The district used to have the area of the east shore of Fujikawa, but due to these mergers, the district is now merely the town of Ichikawamisato.

Districts in Yamanashi Prefecture